Acanthocinus griseus is a species of longhorn beetle of the subfamily Lamiinae. It was described by Johan Christian Fabricius in 1792 and is known from Europe, Russia, and Asia Minor. The beetles are  8-13 millimetres long and live for approximately 1–2 years. They inhabit coniferous trees including those in the genera Pinus, Picea, and Abies. They are also known to inhabit oaks.

References

Beetles described in 1792
Acanthocinus
Beetles of Europe